MacArthur High School (MHS) was the third high school built in Lawton, Oklahoma. MacArthur was built and opened for the east Lawton area in 1969. In the late 1960s and early 1970s, the east Lawton area consisted of four additions or neighborhoods which were under development: Carriage Hills, Park Lane, Sullivan Village, and SunGate.

MacArthur High School was the first high school in the Lawton, Oklahoma area to provide desegregation busing for the residential subdivision of Ranch Oaks during the 1970s. The Ranch Oaks housing addition was located lateral of the Lawton municipal airport on the east side of Southwest 11th street.

Extracurricular activities

Athletics
The following teams have won their respective state championship:
Baseball:  1985 (4A)
Fast pitch softball:  2008 (5A), 2009 (5A), 2010 (5A)
Golf (boys):  2001 (5A)
Track & Field (boys):  1982 (3A), 1983 (3A), 1984 (4A)
Track & Field (girls):  1987 (5A)
Wrestling: 1990 (4A), 2017 Dual State (5A), 2017 (5A)
Football: 2014 (5A)

Records
 Girls 400 Meter Relay State Meet Record: 1987 (5A)
 Boys 400 Meter Relay State Meet Record: 1983 (3A)

Clubs and Organizations
MacArthur High School sponsors the following clubs and organizations for the student body: Archery, Anime Club, Book Club, Choir/Vocal Music, Crime Stoppers, Dance Team, FCA (Fellowship of Christian Athletes), FFA (Future Farmers of America), Key Club, MacArthur High School Band,  JROTC (Junior Reserve Officer's Training Corps), Military Child Club, Multi-Cultural Awareness Club, National Honor Society, Partners Club, Robotics Club, Rocket Club, Science Club, Student Council, The Braveheart Newspaper, The Highlander Yearbook Staff.

External links
Official MacArthur High School Website
Lawton Public Schools
Oklahoma State Department of Education

References

Public high schools in Oklahoma
Lawton, Oklahoma
Educational institutions established in 1969
Schools in Comanche County, Oklahoma
1969 establishments in Oklahoma